Ichnotropis  chapini is a species of lizard in the family Lacertidae. The species is native to Central Africa.

Etymology
The specific name, chapini, is in honor of American ornithologist James Paul Chapin.

Geographic range
I. chapini is found in the Democratic Republic of the Congo and South Sudan.

Habitat

Reproduction
I. chapini is oviparous.

References

Further reading
Edwards S, Branch WR, Vanhooydonck B, Herrel A, Measey GJ, Tolley KA (2013). "Taxonomic adjustments in the systematics of the southern African lacertid lizards (Sauria: Lacertidae)". Zootaxa 3669 (2): 101–114.
Laurent RF (1952). "Batraciens et reptiles récemment acquis par le Musée du Congo Belge". Revue de zoologie et de botanique africaines 44: 198–203. (Ichnotropis capensis chapini, new combination, new status). (in French).
Schmidt KP (1919). "Contributions to the Herpetology of the Belgian Congo Based on the Collection of the American Museum Congo Expedition, 1909–1915. Part I. Turtles, Crocodiles, Lizards, and Chameleons". Bulletin of the American Museum of Natural History 39 (2): 385–624 + Plates VII–XXXII. (Ichnotropis chapini, new species, pp. 508–510, figure 17).

Ichnotropis
Lizards of Africa
Reptiles of the Democratic Republic of the Congo
Endemic fauna of the Democratic Republic of the Congo
Reptiles described in 1919
Taxa named by Karl Patterson Schmidt
Northern Congolian forest–savanna mosaic